The following highways are numbered 100C:

United States
 New York State Route 100C
 Vermont Route 100C

See also
List of highways numbered 100